Yax Nuun Ahiin II also known as Ruler C and Chitam, (before 768-c.794), was an ajaw of the Maya city of Tikal. He took the throne on December 25, 768 and reigning probably until his death. He was son of Yik'in Chan K'awiil and brother of 28th Ruler. The monuments associated with Yax Nuun Ahiin II are: Stelae 19, 21 and Altars 6 and 10.

Notes

Footnotes

References
 

 

Rulers of Tikal
794 deaths
8th century in the Maya civilization
8th-century monarchs in North America
8th century in Guatemala